The Hard Way is a 1943 Warner Bros. musical drama film directed by Vincent Sherman and starring Ida Lupino. The film was based on a story by Irwin Shaw which was reportedly based on Ginger Rogers' relationship with her first husband, Jack Pepper (whom she married in 1928 at age 17) and her own mother, Lela.

Plot

Helen Chernen (Ida Lupino) is an ambitious woman, determined to escape poverty. She pushes her younger sister Katie (Joan Leslie) into a marriage with singer/dancer Albert Runkel (Jack Carson). Katie has no interest in the man, but is desperate to leave the poor conditions that she and her sister live in, in a dirty steel town. Runkel's partner Paul Collins (Dennis Morgan) realizes Helen's deeper intentions and tries to stop her from breaking Runkel's heart.

Now living in wealthier surroundings, Helen tries to make a start on Katie's career. After showcasing her in Runkel's act, she is able to put her in a Broadway production. Katie soon becomes a successful singer and actress, and Collins and Runkel's act flounders. Runkel can't bear being away from his wife on tour and refuses to live off her earnings or even use his wife's name to promote himself. He eventually commits suicide.

Meanwhile, Katie's popularity goes to her head, and she becomes a wild party girl, losing an important opportunity. She later meets with Paul, who is now a successful band leader. He falls in love with Katie, and they start a relationship. However, Katie is forced to choose between him and appearing in Helen's first play.  She chooses the play over Paul, who has asked her to marry him, and he leaves.  Before the play, Paul comes to see Katie to wish her luck, but Helen runs him off and the sisters fight over the motivation for Katie's success.

During the play, Katie forgets lines and has to be cued several times before collapsing in the middle of the production.  Later that evening, after recovering from her collapse, Katie tells Helen that she never wants to see her again.  Paul appears and the two profess their love for each other.

Cast

 Gladys George as Lily Emery
 Faye Emerson as Ice Cream Parlor Waitress
 Paul Cavanagh as John "Jack" Shagrue
 Dolores Moran as Young Blonde (uncredited)
 Emory Parnell as Policeman (uncredited)

Production
Both Bette Davis and Ginger Rogers initially were offered the role of Helen, but both declined. Ida Lupino was cast. Shaw wanted Howard Hawks or William Wyler to direct the film, but because they were busy with other projects, producer Jerry Wald hired Vincent Sherman. Portions of a documentary film by Pare Lorentz were used to represent the mining town of Green Hill. To achieve a more realistic feel during the scenes that took place in Green Hill, neither Lupino nor Leslie wore makeup. The film's first and last scenes were added at Jack L. Warner's insistence that Lupino appear more glamorous in the opening scene.

Soundtrack
"I Love to Dance"
(1942) (uncredited)
Written by M.K. Jerome and Jack Scholl
Played during the opening credits and at the end
Sung by Gladys George at rehearsal with piano accompaniment
Reprised at a show and sung and danced by Joan Leslie (dubbed by Sally Sweetland) and chorus
Sung on a record by Leslie
Played as background music often
"Am I Blue?"
(1929) (uncredited)
Music by Harry Akst
Lyrics by Grant Clarke
Sung by Dennis Morgan and Jack Carson in their vaudeville act
Reprised by Joan Leslie (dubbed by Sally Sweetland)
Played as background music often
"Tip Toe Through the Tulips with Me"
(1929) (uncredited)
Music by Joseph Burke
Lyrics by Al Dubin
Sung by Dennis Morgan and Jack Carson in their vaudeville act
"You're Getting to Be a Habit with Me"
(1932) (uncredited)
Music by Harry Warren
Lyrics by Al Dubin
Played on a juke box in the ice cream parlor
"For You"
(1930) (uncredited)
Music by Joseph Burke
Lyrics by Al Dubin
Played on piano by Dennis Morgan and danced by Joan Leslie
Played as background music
"(You May Not Be an Angel, but) I'll String Along with You"
(1934) (uncredited)
Music by Harry Warren
Lyrics by Al Dubin
Sung by Dennis Morgan and Jack Carson at a vaudeville show and danced by Joan Leslie
"Shuffle Off to Buffalo"
(1932) (uncredited)
Music by Harry Warren
Lyrics by Al Dubin
Sung and danced by Jack Carson and Joan Leslie (voice dubbed by Sally Sweetland) at a vaudeville show
Played as background music
"Forty-Second Street"
(1932) (uncredited)
Music by Harry Warren
Lyrics by Al Dubin
Played as background music
"She's a Latin from Manhattan"
(1935) (uncredited)
Music by Harry Warren
Lyrics by Al Dubin
Sung and danced by Jack Carson and Joan Leslie (voice dubbed by Sally Sweetland) in a nightclub
"I Get a Kick Out of You"
(1934) (uncredited)
Music and lyrics by Cole Porter
Played offscreen by the nightclub band
"Lullaby of Broadway"
(1935) (uncredited)
Music by Harry Warren
Lyrics by Al Dubin
Played offscreen by the nightclub band
"About a Quarter to Nine"
(1935) (uncredited)
Music by Harry Warren
Lyrics by Al Dubin
Played on piano and danced by chorus girls at rehearsal
"Jeepers Creepers"
(1938) (uncredited)
Music by Harry Warren
Lyrics by Johnny Mercer
Sung by a chorus at a show
"My Little Buckaroo"
(1937) (uncredited)
Music by M.K. Jerome
Lyrics by Jack Scholl
Sung by a chorus in a montage
"With Plenty of Money and You"
(1936) (uncredited)
Music by Harry Warren
Lyrics by Al Dubin
Song by a chorus in a show during a montage
"You Must Have Been a Beautiful Baby"
(1938) (uncredited)
Music by Harry Warren
Lyrics by Johnny Mercer
Song by a chorus in a show during a montage
"Begin the Beguine"
(1935) (uncredited)
Music and lyrics by Cole Porter
Played on a record
"Night and Day"
(1932) (uncredited)
Music and lyrics by Cole Porter
Played by the band at the Embassy Club
"Goodnight, My Darling"
(1942) (uncredited)
Written by M.K. Jerome and Jack Scholl
Played by the band at the Oakmont Lodge and
Sung by Dennis Morgan
"There's a Small Hotel"
(1936) (uncredited)
Music by Richard Rodgers
Lyrics by Lorenz Hart
Played as background music at a theater

Awards
Ida Lupino was awarded a New York Film Critics Circle Award for Best Actress for her role in the film.

Reception
"Unconvincing but well mounted drama."
Leslie Halliwell Halliwell's Film Guide, Eighth edition, revised and updated, edited by John Walker, © 1992 Ruth Halliwell and John Walker. HarperCollinsPublishers, Inc.

References

External links

 
 
 
 

1943 films
1940s musical drama films
1943 romantic drama films
American black-and-white films
American musical drama films
American romantic drama films
Films about entertainers
Films directed by Vincent Sherman
Warner Bros. films
Films scored by Heinz Roemheld
1940s English-language films
1940s American films